The Bay of Pomerania is a basin in the southwestern Baltic Sea, off the Pomeranian shores of Poland and Germany. It stretches between the northernmost tip of the island of Rugia called Gellort northwest of Cape Arkona in the west, and the village of Jarosławiec in the east. In the south, it is bounded by the islands of Usedom/Uznam and Wolin, which separate it from the Szczecin Lagoon which is flown through by the Oder River, and is connected to the bay by three straits, the Dziwna, Świna, and Peenestrom. 

The Bay of Greifswald with the islands of Koos and Vilm is a large sub-bay in the southwest of the Bay of Pomerania. Apart from Rugia, Usedom/Uznam, and Wolin, the islands Greifswalder Oie and Ruden also lie in the Bay of Pomerania. Maximum depth is 20 metres and salinity is about 8%. The main ports on the Bay of Pomerania are Mukran Port in Sassnitz-Mukran, the port of Świnoujście, the port of Kołobrzeg, the port of Greifswald on the mouth of the Ryck River in Greifswald-Wieck, the port of Dziwnów, and the port of Wolgast.

See also 
 Bay of Pomerania Nature Reserve

External links

 Zrot : Tourism Site Western Pomerania (PL) (Polish, English, German)
 Zart : Polish Tourism Site Western Pomerania (PL) (Polish, English, German)
 German Tourism Site : Regional Tourist Board Vorpommern (D) (English, German, Swedish, Polish)

Pomerania
Pomerania
Pomerania
Landforms of West Pomeranian Voivodeship
Natura 2000 in Germany
Natura 2000 in Poland
Germany–Poland border